Barran is a commune in France.

Barran may also refer to:

Barran, Yemen, in the Sanaa Governorate
Barran Temple, in the Marib Governorate, Yemen
Barran baronets (United Kingdom)

People with the surname
Diana Barran, Baroness Barran, British charity campaigner and peer
John Barran (disambiguation), several people
Perdita Barran, British scientist
Peter Barran, (born 1936), Australian footballer
Petra Barran, British entrepreneur and founder of the London street food collective KERB
Sir Rowland Barran (1858–1949), English politician

See also 
 Baran (disambiguation)